The 1965–66 Drexel Dragons men's basketball team represented Drexel Institute of Technology during the 1965–66 men's basketball season. The Dragons, led by 14th year head coach Samuel Cozen, played their home games at Sayre High School and were members of the College–Southern division of the Middle Atlantic Conferences (MAC).

The team finished the regular season 19–1, and finished in 1st place in the MAC in the regular season.

Roster

Schedule

|-
!colspan=9 style="background:#F8B800; color:#002663;"| Regular season
|-

|-
!colspan=9 style="background:#F8B800; color:#002663;"| 1966 Middle Atlantic Conference men's basketball tournament

|-
!colspan=9 style="background:#F8B800; color:#002663;"| 1966 NCAA College Division basketball tournament

References

Drexel Dragons men's basketball seasons
Drexel
1965 in sports in Pennsylvania
1966 in sports in Pennsylvania